Maxime Rémillard is a Canadian businessman born on January 17, 1975, in Greenfield Park, Quebec.  He is the president of both Remcorp, a leading Canadian private investment firm and Remstar Media, an entertainment and content delivery company.

Biography 
After graduating with a Bachelor of Arts from the University of Ottawa and studying production at the University of Southern California, Rémillard founded Remstar in 1997, a film production and distribution company. Under the label, he produced Denis Villeneuve’s film Polytechnique, which won the Genie Award for Best Canadian Film in 2010, Head in the Clouds starring Charlize Theron and Mesrine: Killer Instinct starring Vincent Cassel. As a distributor, he acquired the rights for Dallas Buyers Club by Jean-Marc Vallée and Barry Jenkin’s Moonlight, which won the Oscar for Best Film in 2017.

Remcorp

Over the years, he put his influence and ideas at the service of diversification by founding the investment company Remcorp. His company, whose team has cumulatively completed more than $3B in transactions in recent years, is increasing investments with well-established companies in a wide range of sectors including technology, transportation services, real estate and agro-technology. Remcorp also works in the media industry with its company Remstar Media, owner of the specialty channels MAX and ELLE Fictions.

Philanthropy 

Rémillard serves on the board of directors of the Fondation du Musée Pointe-à-Callière. For four years, he has partnered with the Mira Foundation. His family helped create the Yosh Taguchi Chair for Urological Cancer Research at McGill University. The Rémillard family also supports and sponsors Centraide, the Jewish General Hospital Foundation and La Maison des Petits Tournesols.

Personal life 
Rémillard was in a relationship with actress Karine Vanasse from 2006 to 2014.

External links 

 Remcorp 
 Remstar Media

Sources 

Film producers from Quebec
Living people
People from Longueuil
University of Ottawa alumni
1975 births
Canadian chief executives
French Quebecers
Canadian film production company founders